was a town located in Iishi District, Shimane Prefecture, Japan.

As of 2003, the town had an estimated population of 2,968 and 2300.77 persons per km². The total area was 1.29 km².

On January 1, 2005, Tonbara, along with the town of Akagi (also from Iishi District), was merged to create the town of Iinan.

Geography
The Kando River (神戸川) runs through Tonbara. Mt. Kotobiki (琴引山) is to the southeast, between Tonbara and Akagi in Iinan.

External links
Official website of Iinan 

Dissolved municipalities of Shimane Prefecture